Diomid Gherman (10 April 1928 – 19 April 2014) was a professor and researcher from Moldova and a corresponding member of the Academy of Sciences of Moldova. He was a leader of the Democratic Forum of Romanians in Moldova.

Biography
Gherman was born on April 10, 1928 in the village Bocșa, Fălești district, in a family of teachers. After graduating the school of his village, he continued his studies at Commercial High School, then at General School no. 1 in Bălți, which he graduated successfully in 1946. Between 1946 and 1951 he studied at the State Medical Institute in Chișinău. After graduating from the Institute, he began his activity as head physician at the Chirileni village Hospital of Ungheni district (1951-1952). In 1952, he was admitted to clinical neurology at the Department of Neurology, under the leadership of renowned scholar Boris Șarapov. Consecutively, he served as the Head of Hospital of Congaz District (1954-1956), Inspector of the Ministry of Health and Chairman of the Central Committee of the Red Cross in Moldova.

Fully devoted to medicine and science, Gherman has continuously improved his knowledge and practical skills. In 1962, he held the Postgraduate diploma in medical sciences, and a decade later - the PhD degree. Since 1961, Gherman has served as assistant, then lecturer at the Department of Neurology. In 1973, he obtained his professorship. During 1969-1998, Gherman held the position of head of the Department of Neurology of the State University of Medicine and Pharmacy "Nicolae Testemitanu". Later, he worked as  university professor at the same university and as a senior  collaborator in the Vertebra-neurology Laboratory of the Institute of Neurology and Neurosurgery. Since 1993, Gherman is elected academician of the Academy of Sciences of Moldova. Professor  Gherman is the founder of the National School of Neurology and Neurosurgery. Under his leadership, the priority directions of the native neurological school were drawn, including vascular medullary pathology. Academician Gherman is known in the medical and scientific world and as founder of the national vertebra-neurology school.

In over 55 years of teaching, Gherman trained several generations of specialists, who are working in the republic and abroad. Gherman is recognized as the patriarch of national neurology. His research in the field of neurology is recognized  out of the borders of the Republic of Moldova, and the outcomes  have been reflected in about 400 publications, including 12 journals. Gherman is an outstanding contemporary figure.

Academician Gherman promoted home neurologya at the international level. Since 1989, he organized 12 scientific meetings of neurologists and neurosurgeons from the Republic of Moldova and România. Thanks to his contribution, Moldova became a member of the European Federation of Neurological Societies. Neurosurgeon Gherman saved life of hundreds of patients. For outstanding merit in activity, he was honored with the high titles of Emeritus Scholar of RM, the State Award, the Man of the Year and the Citizen of Honor of Falești town. He received several state distinctions. Gherman was a professor, a clinician and a well-known researcher, but a great patriot of the nation. The high school in his native village now bears his name. Gherman died on April 19, 2014.

Awards
 Emeritus of the Republic of Moldova (1984),
 titular member of the Academy of Sciences of Moldova (1993),
 member of the Euro-Asian Academy of Sciences,
 honorary member of the Romanian Medical Academy (1994).
 "Scientist Emeritus from Moldovan SSR" (1984),
 "Civic Merit" (1995),
 order "Gloria Muncii" (1998), "For bravery in work", "Dimitrie Cantemir", "Nicolae Testemitanu",
 Laureate of the State Prize of the Republic of Moldova (1998)
 "Civic Merit" medal.

References

External links 
 Diomid Gherman
 Diomid Gherman la 80 ani
 Lista membrilor Academiei de Ştiinţe a Moldovei

1928 births
Romanian people of Moldovan descent
Moldovan neurologists
Moldovan activists
People from Fălești District
2014 deaths
Recipients of the Order of Work Glory
Soviet neurologists